Morgan, Lewis & Bockius LLP is an American multinational law firm with approximately 2,200 legal professionals in 31 offices across North America, Europe, Asia, and the Middle East. Mergers with other law firms stimulated global growth and led to a ranking of eighth on American Lawyer's 2018 top 100 firms by gross revenue list. It is also the largest law firm chaired by a woman, and represents "three-quarters of the Fortune 100 companies." 

From 2005 to 2021, the firm served as tax counsel to former U.S. President Donald Trump and the Trump Organization. Morgan Lewis is known for high-profile pro bono representations and for filing a historic amicus brief in the U.S. Supreme Court in 2015 on behalf of 379 companies, making a business case for legalizing same-sex marriage across the country.

History

19th century
Morgan Lewis was founded in Philadelphia on March 10, 1873, by Civil War veteran Charles Eldridge Morgan, Jr., who later served as Philadelphia Law Academy's vice president, and Francis Draper Lewis, son of a wholesale dry goods merchant, whose first cousin was William Draper Lewis, the dean of University of Pennsylvania Law School.

In 1883, Morgan & Lewis hired Morris Rex Bockius, who had graduated in June of that year with Master of Arts and Bachelor of Law degrees from the University of Pennsylvania Law School. He became a partner fifteen years after he joined the firm, which he then led until his death in 1939. The firm became Morgan, Lewis & Bockius in 1908, though is still commonly referred to by its sobriquet, "Morgan Lewis."

The firm began representing the United Gas Improvement Company, later UGI, in 1882, which became the largest gas and electric utility company in the United States and which, well over a century later, remained a client of the firm. From the early 20th century, Morgan, Lewis & Bockius represented many other companies, including Philadelphia’s largest daily newspaper, Philadelphia Bulletin; Pennsylvania’s largest railroad, Baldwin Locomotive Works; Scott Paper; and several major banks and trust companies.

20th century
In 1963, Morgan Lewis hired its first female law associate, Gail McKnight Beckman, daughter of Deputy Secretary of Banking of Pennsylvania Irland McKnight Beckman and family psychology author Elizabeth B. Hurlock, and, in 1980, Stephanie Abramson, became its first female law partner; she is now Adjunct Professor of Clinical Law and Director of Law and Business Experiential Classes at New York University School of Law.

21st century
Following the chairmanships of Thomas Lefevre, then Francis "Fran" Milone in 2014, Jami Wintz McKeon– who had started with the firm in 1981 –was elected to chair the firm, distinguishing her as leading the largest female-chaired law firm in the world. Re-elected in 2018; McKeon is a proponent of work flexibility, such as remote work, and has received numerous professional awards, including, in 2017, being named a "Client Service All-Star" by BTT Consulting Group and a "Business Hall of Fame Icon" by The Philadelphia Inquirer. During McKeon's tenure, the firm has continued to scale its national and international presence, growing into one of the largest law firms in the world. Under her leadership, the firm has also been recognized annually with Gold Standard Certification by the Women in Law Empowerment Forum (WILEF).

In 2015, Morgan Lewis filed a historic amicus brief for the definitive Supreme Court case of Obergefell v. Hodges, on behalf of 379 companies, including Apple, Google, Microsoft, Amazon, Walmart, JPMorgan Chase, and the New England Patriots, which argued "a business case for legalizing same-sex marriage across the country." Partner Susan Baker Manning, who authored the brief, in 2018, was added as a full-time senior trial lawyer to the firm's pro bono group led by senior counsel Rachel Strong, with focus remaining primarily on refugee and civil rights, and "issue-based litigation", according to firm chair Jami McKeon. The firm is an affiliate firm of the Minority Corporate Counsel Association (MCCA).

In 2018, former Morgan Lewis partner John Ring was confirmed by the National Labor Relations Board, one of several firm partners who have served on its board, including Harry Johnson and senior counsel Charles Cohen.

In 2018, Morgan Lewis published findings of its investigation into sexual harassment at NPR, led by the head the firm's labor and employment group, partner Grace Speights, with partner Margaret Rodgers Schmidt and associate Jocelyn Cuttino; which precipitated the apologetic resignation of NPR's senior vice-president of News, Michael Oreskes. Morgan Lewis recommendations were noted as offering "broad guidance for companies that are taking fresh looks at their own practices." In February 2018, former Humane Society CEO Wayne Pacelle also resigned amid similar allegations, while under investigation by the firm; The National Law Journal referenced Morgan Lewis as working on the "front lines" in representing cases central to "long-overdue reforms in workplaces toxic to women."

In March 2019, Equal Employment Opportunity Commission member and lead drafter of the Employment Non-Discrimination Act Chai Feldblum, whose term had expired January 4, became a partner of the firm, then stating to Bloomberg Law that the move from public service to a "Big Law management-side firm", considered unusual, was the best way to help employers implement the workplace harassment guidelines outlined by herself and Victoria Lipnic at the EEOC, describing the firm as "the place from which to help make that institutional change”, of preventing harassment from happening in the workplace.

Mergers and office locations
Morgan Lewis was among the avant garde of multinational law firms when its first international office opened in London in 1981 and, today, includes more than 2000 legal professionals worldwide, with offices in Abu Dhabi; Beijing; Boston; Brussels; Century City, California; Chicago; Costa Mesa, California; Dallas; Dubai; Frankfurt; Hartford, Connecticut; Hong Kong; Houston; Almaty and Astana, Kazakhstan; London; Los Angeles; Miami; Moscow; New York; Palo Alto (Silicon Valley), California; Paris; Philadelphia; Pittsburgh; Princeton, New Jersey; San Francisco; Shanghai; Singapore; Tokyo; Washington, D.C.; and Wilmington, Delaware.

On November 14, 2014, Morgan Lewis's partnership voted to admit 227 partners from Bingham McCutchen LLP into the firm as partners, scaling Morgan Lewis into one of the largest law firms in the world, with the addition of 750 partners, attorneys, and staff joining Morgan Lewis on November 24, 2014.  On March 15, 2015, Morgan Lewis and Singapore’s Stamford Law Corporation announced a combination that created a fully integrated law firm in Singapore. The combination established a business transactions, litigation, and arbitration practice to serve clients with interests in Singapore and across the expanding Asian marketplace.

, Morgan Lewis has 31 offices in the United States, Belgium, China, France, Germany, Japan, Kazakhstan, Russia, Hong Kong, Singapore, the United Arab Emirates, and the United Kingdom.

Client representation
Morgan Lewis & Bockius clients include 75 per cent of all Fortune 100 companies, nearly 300 Fortune 500 companies, 65 Fortune Global 100 companies, and nearly half of all Fortune Global 500 companies. Morgan Lewis has also been named among the top 10 BigLaw firm ranked by pro bono hours, with over 1800 pro bono clients, and 117,000 hours contributed to 2,234 pro bono matters by firm attorneys in 2018.

Notable pro bono clients include John Thompson (1963 – 2017), represented by Michael L. Banks and J. Gordon Cooney Jr., whose execution was stayed in 1999 based on forensic evidence which had been "deliberately hidden" by a former assistant prosecutor; Thompson was finally freed in 2003. A book based on Thompson's legal misfortunes, Killing Time: An 18-year Odyssey from Death Row to Freedom, by John Hollway and Ronald M. Gauthier, was optioned for a film by Touchstone Pictures in 2009. Attorneys Christina K. Harper and George Cumming waged a successful 11-year pro bono legal battle gained freedom for Kelly Savage, whose sentence for a 1995 murder conviction was commuted in 2017 by California Governor Jerry Brown.

Represented pro bono by Morgan Lewis & Bockius, with Lambda Legal and Immigration Equality; in October 2020, the United States Department of State withdrew its appeal of the verdict in Kiviti v. Pompeo, and declined to appeal Mize-Gregg v. Pompeo. Federal district courts ruled the State Department’s refusal to recognize children born oversees to married same-sex, American citizen couples as U.S. citizens to be unlawful in both cases. Morgan Lewis partner Susan Baker Manning argued both cases, successfully challenging the State Department's policy of denying children born outside of the U.S. to some American same-sex, married couples birthright citizenship.

US presidents and presidential candidates
Morgan Lewis has represented several prominent politicians in various venues, including:

 Donald Trump — Morgan, Lewis & Bockius represented United States President Donald Trump, advising him and the Trump Organization from 2005 to January 2021. Critics have accused Morgan Lewis of aiding Trump in using his Presidential office for personal gain. The Wallace Global Fund fired Morgan Lewis over its ties to Trump. Morgan Lewis issued a letter in May 2017 stating they had examined Trump's tax returns and found no significant financial connection to Russia. Sheri Dillon, a member of the firm, is Donald Trump's former tax attorney.

Morgan Lewis partner James "Jim" Hamilton was one of three assistant chief counsellors of the United States Senate Watergate Committee during 1973 - 1974, the findings of which prompted the impeachment process against Richard Nixon that led to Nixon's resignation on August 9, 1974. Hamilton was reported by the Washingtonian, in 2016, as the "go-to guy for Democratic nominees in search of a vice-presidential pick;" he has vetted running mates for:
 Hillary Clinton, in 2016
 Barack Obama (with Eric Holder and Caroline Kennedy), in 2008
 John Kerry, in 2004
 Al Gore, in 2000.

Sale of web domain to Major League Baseball

The law firm was the original holder of the web domain name MLB.com.  In September 2000, they agreed to transfer the domain name to Major League Baseball. Elected in 2015, Major League Baseball Commissioner Rob Manfred is an alumnus of the Morgan, Lewis law firm.

Awards and honors
Since 2008, Morgan Lewis has been named annually as among the "Best Places to Work for LGBT Equality" by the Human Rights Campaign (HRC).

The firm's Moscow office was recognized by Chambers & Partners’ 2016 Chambers Europe guide as the "Russia Law Firm of the Year" for excellence in client service, preeminence in the Russian relevant market, notable achievements and wins during 2016, outstanding work, and strategic growth.

In 2016 and 2017, Morgan Lewis was named among "America's Best Corporate Law Firms" by the NYSE Governance Service and FTI Consulting, Inc.

In 2018, the Justice and Diversity Center (JDC) awarded Morgan Lewis its "Outstanding Law Firm in Public Service Award" for exceptional pro bono of JDC Legal Services and Diversity programs.

In August 2018, Morgan Lewis was named among the 41 law firms to receive the first Mansfield Certifications, awarded for diversity hiring practices.

References

External links
 
The American Lawyer - Morgan Lewis Firm Profile

Law firms established in 1873
Law firms based in Philadelphia
Foreign law firms with offices in Japan
1873 establishments in Pennsylvania
Donald Trump
Foreign law firms with offices in Hong Kong